Touch rugby at the 2019 Pacific Games was played from 15–20 July 2019 at St Joseph's Sports Field in Samoa.

Medal summary

Medal table

Results

Men's tournament

Women's tournament

Mixed tournament

See also
 Touch rugby at the Pacific Games

References

 
2019 Pacific Games
2019